Frank S. "Pat" Miller was an American football and basketball coach.  He served as the head football coach at Wake Forest College—now known as Wake Forest University—from 1929 to 1932, tallying a mark of 18–15–4.  Miller was also the head basketball coach at Loyola College In Maryland—now known as Loyola University Maryland—from 1926 to 1928 and at Wake Forest from 1928 to 1930, compiling a career college basketball record of 18–37.

Miller attended Atlantic City High School and the Peddie Institute—now known as Peddie School—in Hightstown, New Jersey.  He coached with Stan Cofall at Roman Catholic High School in Philadelphia before moving with Cofall to Loyola in 1925.  Miller played with the Pottsville Maroons in the Anthracite League in 1924.

Head coaching record

Football

References

Year of birth missing
Year of death missing
Basketball coaches from New Jersey
College men's basketball head coaches in the United States
Loyola Greyhounds football coaches
Loyola Greyhounds men's basketball coaches
Pottsville Maroons (Anthracite League) players
Wake Forest Demon Deacons football coaches
Wake Forest Demon Deacons men's basketball coaches
High school football coaches in Pennsylvania
Peddie School alumni
Sportspeople from Atlantic City, New Jersey